Olyushino is a rural locality (a village) in Cheryomushskoye Rural Settlement of Kotlassky District, Arkhangelsk Oblast, Russia. The population was 1 as of 2010.

Geography 
It is located on the Besedka River.

References 

Rural localities in Kotlassky District